Zakhele Qwabe (born 25 May 1988) is a South African first-class cricketer. He was included in the Boland cricket team squad for the 2015 Africa T20 Cup.

He was the leading wicket-taker in the 2017–18 Sunfoil 3-Day Cup for Boland, with 34 dismissals in ten matches. In April 2021, he was named in Boland's squad, ahead of the 2021–22 cricket season in South Africa.

References

External links
 

1988 births
Living people
South African cricketers
Boland cricketers
Cricketers from Durban